Robert Paul Coogan (April 1, 1922 – March 9, 2015) was a vice admiral in the United States Navy who served as its Commander, Naval Air Forces from 1976 to 1980  and Third Fleet from 1975 to 1976. He was born in Newport, Rhode Island. After leaving the Navy, Coogan worked as president of Aerojet. In his later years, he resided in San Diego, California, where he died in 2015 at the age of 92.

References

1922 births
2015 deaths
People from Newport, Rhode Island
United States Navy vice admirals
United States Naval Academy alumni